Jaume Rovira (born 3 November 1979) is a Spanish former racing cyclist. He rode at the 2014 UCI Road World Championships.

Major results

2003 
 2nd Overall Vuelta Ciclista a León
1st Points classification
1st Stage 5
 5th Clásica Memorial Txuma
2004
 1st Stage 3 Vuelta a Palencia
 1st Stage 1 Giro Ciclistico della Provincia di Cosenza 
 2nd Overall Copa de España
 6th Overall Vuelta a la Comunidad de Madrid
2005
 3rd Overall Vuelta a La Rioja
 10th Subida al Naranco
2006
 1st GP Llodio
 4th Overall Vuelta a la Rioja
 7th Klasika Primavera
2007
 3rd Overall Circuito Montañés
 5th GP Villafranca de Ordizia
 7th Overall Vuelta a la Comunidad de Madrid
 7th Subida al Naranco
 10th Overall Vuelta a Asturias
2008
 4th Road race, National Road Championships
 5th Overall Euskal Bizikleta
 5th Subida al Naranco
 10th Overall Vuelta a Asturias
2009
 1st Prueba Villafranca de Ordizia
 5th Overall Vuelta a Murcia
 9th Subida al Naranco
 9th Overall Cinturó de l'Empordà
 10th Overall Troféu Joaquim Agostinho
2011
 7th Overall International Tour of Hellas
2012
 7th Overall Vuelta Ciclista a León
2014
 1st Stages 6 & 8 Vuelta al Ecuador

References

External links
 

1979 births
Living people
Spanish male cyclists
Sportspeople from the Province of León
Cyclists from Castile and León